Barry John Hancock (30 December 1938 – 10 September 2013) was an English footballer who played as an inside-forward. He played 24 league games in the English Football League for Port Vale and Crewe Alexandra from 1961 to 1965.

Career
Hancock supported Port Vale since childhood and also spent matchdays working as a programme seller at Vale Park. He managed to join the club as an amateur after a time with Birches Head R.C. He signed as a professional in July 1957 and finally made his debut on 24 April 1961 against Potteries derby rivals Stoke City in the (replayed) final of the Supporters' Clubs' Trophy in 1961. He played two Third Division games in 1960–61, though Norman Low played him just six times in 1961–62. He impressed in league FA Cup games against Bradford Park Avenue, but had to reject an approach to join the club by player-manager Jimmy Scoular as Vale retained his registration. He featured nine times at Vale Park in 1962–63, before scoring his first and only senior goal on 9 September 1963, in a 1–1 draw with Mansfield Town at Field Mill, in one of only five appearances for the "Valiants" in 1963–64; Hancock was released by manager Freddie Steele at the end of the season. He moved on to Crewe Alexandra, playing three Fourth Division games in 1964–65, and later played for non-league Stafford Rangers. He later played for All Blacks before going back to Birches Head R.C. as a referee. After retiring, he once more became a programme distributor at Vale Park.

Career statistics
Source:

A.  The "Other" column constitutes appearances and goals in the League Cup, Football League Trophy, Football League play-offs and Full Members Cup.

References

1938 births
2013 deaths
Sportspeople from Hanley, Staffordshire
English footballers
Association football forwards
Port Vale F.C. players
Crewe Alexandra F.C. players
Stafford Rangers F.C. players
English Football League players
English football referees
Port Vale F.C. non-playing staff